WWIL (1490 AM) was a radio station broadcasting a Gospel format, licensed to Wilmington, North Carolina, United States. The station was last owned by James and Maxzine Utley, through licensee CLI Radio, LLC.

History
From 1964 to 1977, the station had the call sign WHSL.

R. Darryl Davis was host of "Fat Man's Blues Shop" on WWIL; he later played "Blues in the Night" on WHQR.

Family Radio Network Inc. purchased WWIL in 1992 from a Jacksonville church. Before that, the station was R&B. WWIL began calling itself "Family Radio" in 1993. Jim Stephens worked for a Raleigh Christian station but vacationed in Wilmington. When he turned on the radio, he found no Christian stations, so he took over WWIL. Stephens struggled financially after moving to Wilmington but he got numerous cards and letters from people who enjoyed the Contemporary Christian music and nationally syndicated ministers. Stephens needed for these listeners to prove their support with cash, and they did. WWIL added a 20,000-watt FM signal in 1995. As of 1999, the AM station aired "God's Country" during the day, including Ricky Skaggs, The Gatlin Brothers and traditional Southern gospel. At night and early in the morning, the station played urban gospel such as Andrae Crouch and Shirley Caesar.

On August 16, 2022, WWIL’s license was cancelled by the Federal Communications Commission, due to having been silent for more than a year. FM translator W285FQ’s license was also cancelled.

References

External links
FCC Station Search Details: DWWIL (Facility ID: 20662)
FCC History Cards for WWIL (covering 1959-1981)

WIL (AM)
Radio stations established in 1964
Radio stations disestablished in 2022
Defunct radio stations in the United States
1964 establishments in North Carolina
2022 disestablishments in North Carolina
Defunct religious radio stations in the United States
WIL